The 2011 Great West Conference men's basketball tournament took place March 10–12, 2011 in Orem, Utah.  According to National Collegiate Athletic Association (NCAA) regulations, as a new Division I conference the Great West champion does not receive an automatic bid into the NCAA tournament until 2020. However, 2011 champion North Dakota received an automatic bid to the 2011 CollegeInsider.com Tournament. In the 2010 tournament the South Dakota Coyotes defeated the Houston Baptist Huskies to claim their first basketball tournament championship.

The third seeded Fighting Sioux of North Dakota defeated 2010 Great West tournament champion South Dakota 77–76 in a double-overtime thriller.  The Coyotes had upset number 1 seed Utah Valley in the semi-finals.  The game was won on a three-pointer from Sioux guard Josh Schuler with four seconds remaining.  The championship result was a fitting end to a tournament that saw all six games decided by a total of eleven points.  North Dakota's Patrick Mitchell was named tournament MVP.

Format
All seven conference members qualify for the tournament with seeding based on standings from the regular season. The number 1 team receives a first round bye.

Bracket
* – Denotes overtime period

References

Great West Conference men's basketball tournament